Mohamed Bahari (born June 29, 1976 in Sidi Bel Abbes, Algeria) is a boxer from Algeria.

Bahari won the bronze medal in the middleweight division (71–75 kg) at the 1996 Summer Olympics in Atlanta. He shared the podium with US boxer Rhoshii Wells.

Olympic results
Defeated Marcus Thomas (Barbados) RSC 2 (2:20)
Defeated Akaki Kakauridze (Georgia) 8-5
Defeated Brian Magee (Ireland) 15-9
Lost to Malik Beyleroğlu (Turkey) 11-11, referee's decision

Pro career
Bahari turned pro in 2003, his last fight came in 2004 and he retired with a record of 3-2-2.

Professional boxing record

| style="text-align:center;" colspan="8"|3 Wins (1 knockout, 2 decisions),  2 Losses (1 knockout, 1 decision), 2 Draws
|-  style="text-align:center; background:#e3e3e3;"
|  style="border-style:none none solid solid; "|Res.
|  style="border-style:none none solid solid; "|Record
|  style="border-style:none none solid solid; "|Opponent
|  style="border-style:none none solid solid; "|Type
|  style="border-style:none none solid solid; "|Rd., Time
|  style="border-style:none none solid solid; "|Date
|  style="border-style:none none solid solid; "|Location
|  style="border-style:none none solid solid; "|Notes
|- align=center
|Loss
|align=center|3-2-2||align=left| Gusmyr Perdomo
|
|
|
|align=left|
|align=left|
|- align=center
|Draw
|align=center|3-1-2||align=left| Victor Ansoula Mayala
|
|
|
|align=left|
|align=left|
|- align=center
|Loss
|align=center|3-1-1||align=left| Frederic Mainhaguiet
|
|
|
|align=left|
|align=left|
|- align=center
|Win
|align=center|3-0-1||align=left| Nourredine Maazouz
|
|
|
|align=left|
|align=left|
|- align=center
|Draw
|align=center|2-0-1||align=left| Christophe Karagoz
|
|
|
|align=left|
|align=left|
|- align=center
|Win
|align=center|2-0||align=left| Antoine Lojacono
|
|
|
|align=left|
|align=left|
|- align=center
|Win
|align=center|1-0||align=left| Mounir Sahli
|
|
|
|align=left|
|align=left|
|- align=center

Career 
Olympic Games

  OlympicGames1996 (Atlanta, USA)  (-75 kg)

World Amateur Boxing Championships

 Quarter-finals World Junior Championships (Istanbul, Turkey) 1994 (-75 kg)
 Preliminaries 1/16 World Amateur Boxing Championships 1995 (Berlin, Germany) (-75 kg)

CISM - World Military Championships

  CISM Championships ( San Antonio, USA) 1997 (- 81 kg )

African Amateur Boxing Championships

  African Amateur Boxing Championships 1998 ( Algiers, Algeria )  (- 81 kg )
  African Amateur Boxing Championships ( Johannesburg, South Africa) 1994 (-75 kg)

All-Africa Games

  All-Africa Games  (Harare, Zimbabwe ) 1995 (-75 kg)
  All-Africa Games ( Johannesburg, South Africa) 1999  (- 81 kg )

Pan Arab Games

  Pan Arab Games 1997 ( Beirut, Lebanon) (-75 kg)
  Pan Arab Games 1999 (Amman, Jordan)  (- 81 kg )

International tournaments 

  Italia Junior ( Sardinia, Italy )1994 (- 81 kg )
  President's Cup ( Jakarta, Indonesia) 1995 (-75 kg)
 Quarter-finals Strandja Memorial ( Sofia, Bulgaria) 1996 (-75 kg)

References

External links
 
 

1976 births
Living people
Middleweight boxers
Boxers at the 1996 Summer Olympics
Olympic boxers of Algeria
Olympic bronze medalists for Algeria
Olympic medalists in boxing
People from Sidi Bel Abbès
Algerian male boxers
Medalists at the 1996 Summer Olympics
African Games gold medalists for Algeria
African Games medalists in boxing
Competitors at the 1995 All-Africa Games
Competitors at the 1999 All-Africa Games
21st-century Algerian people
20th-century Algerian people